Antonin-Strugi  is a settlement in the administrative district of Gmina Przygodzice, within Ostrów Wielkopolski County, Greater Poland Voivodeship, in west-central Poland.

References

Antonin-Strugi